The Princess Royal Hospital is a teaching hospital located in Apley Castle, Telford, England. It forms the Telford site of the Shrewsbury and Telford Hospital NHS Trust and serves patients in Telford and Wrekin, the rest of Shropshire, and Powys, in conjunction with the Royal Shrewsbury Hospital.

History
The hospital, which is laid out using the nucleus design concept with a standard cruciform floor plan template with facilities on each side of a hospital 'street', was completed in 1989.

In 2012, a re-organisation took place whereby inpatient general and vascular services were consolidated at the Royal Shrewsbury Hospital, while inpatient children's, maternity, gynaecological and breast surgery beds were concentrated on the Princess Royal Hospital site. Balfour Beatty carried out the works to build a new Women and Children's Unit at the Princess Royal Hospital.

Performance

The Trust was fined £333,000 in November 2017 after four patients sustained fatal falls at the Princess Royal Hospital between June 2011 and November 2012.

In July 2018 fears were expressed by the local council that overnight accident and emergency closures could be on the horizon for the hospital and in September 2018 it was announced that the A&E department would be closed from 8pm to 8am each night and patients diverted to the Royal Wolverhampton NHS Trust and the Royal Shrewsbury Hospital. This was after the Care Quality Commission had served the trust with an enforcement notice over the safety of its emergency services.  Only 68.4% of A&E attenders met the 4 hour targets in the first quarter of 2018–19. However, after the hospital managed to recruit more A&E doctors and nurses the overnight A&E closure was cancelled.

In January 2019 plans to convert the accident and emergency department into an urgent care centre and turn the hospital into a planned care site were approved by the clinical commissioning group.

Services
The hospital has 327 inpatient beds.

Notable patients

Those reported to have died at the hospital include:
Norman Jones, former actor (2013)
Dalian Atkinson, former professional footballer, confirmed dead after arrival after being tasered in an incident by police (2016)

See also
 List of hospitals in England

References

External links
 Shrewsbury & Telford Hospital NHS Trust

Hospital buildings completed in 1989
Hospitals in Shropshire
Hospitals established in 1989
NHS hospitals in England
Teaching hospitals in England
Buildings and structures in Telford